Bill Behrens and Matt Lucena were the defending champions but only Behrens competed that year with Kelly Jones.

Behrens and Jones lost in the first round to Rikard Bergh and Shelby Cannon.

Ctislav Doseděl and Pavel Vízner won in the final 6–7, 6–4, 6–3 against David Adams and Menno Oosting.

Seeds
Champion seeds are indicated in bold text while text in italics indicates the round in which those seeds were eliminated.

 Luis Lobo /  Javier Sánchez (quarterfinals)
 Libor Pimek /  Byron Talbot (semifinals)
 David Adams /  Menno Oosting (final)
 Jim Grabb /  Gary Muller (first round)

Draw

References
 1996 International ÖTV Raiffeisen Grand Prix Doubles Draw

Hypo Group Tennis International
1996 ATP Tour